WKCJ is a Classic Hits and Oldies formatted broadcast radio station licensed to White Sulphur Springs, West Virginia, serving Lewisburg and Union in West Virginia and Covington in Virginia. WKCJ is owned and operated by Radio Greenbrier, LLC.

References

External links
 

2015 establishments in West Virginia
Classic hits radio stations in the United States
Oldies radio stations in the United States
Radio stations established in 2015
KCJ